Palazzo Pretorio may refer to:

 Palazzo Pretorio, Arezzo
 Palazzo Pretorio, Cividale del Friuli, Italy
 Palazzo Pretorio, Gubbio
 Palazzo Pretorio, Lucca, Italy
 Palazzo Pretorio, Palermo, Italy
 Palazzo Pretorio, Prato, Italy
 Palazzo Vilhena, Malta
 Praetorian Palace, Koper, Slovenia